Harry Wainwright (born 1899; date of death unknown) was an English footballer.

Career
Wainwright played for Highfields before joining Port Vale as an amateur in December 1919. After making his debut in a 1–0 defeat at Barnsley on Boxing Day he signed as a professional the following month. He was unable to nail down a regular place however, and was released at the end of the season with just four appearances to his name.

He returned to Highfields before moving on to Doncaster Rovers where he scored in their return to football following WW1, in the 2–1 defeat to Rotherham Town in the Midland League. He scored two more goals that season, and none the following season.

He then went to Brodsworth Main, Frickley Colliery, Sheffield United, Boston Town, Scunthorpe & Lindsey United and Newark Town.

Career statistics
Source:

References

Footballers from Sheffield
English footballers
Association football forwards
Port Vale F.C. players
Doncaster Rovers F.C. players
Brodsworth Welfare A.F.C. players
Frickley Athletic F.C. players
Sheffield United F.C. players
Boston Town F.C. (1920s) players
Scunthorpe United F.C. players
Newark Town F.C. players
English Football League players
1899 births
Year of death missing